George Edgcumbe (23 June 1800 – 18 February 1882) was a British diplomat and politician.

He was the youngest son of Richard Edgcumbe, 2nd Earl of Mount Edgcumbe.  He was educated at Harrow School, and at Balliol College, Oxford. In 1834, he married Fanny Lucy, daughter of Sir John Shelley, 6th Baronet; they had 6 children.

At the general election in June 1826 he was elected as a Member of Parliament (MP) for the rotten borough of Plympton Erle,
on his father's interest. However, he resigned his seat in December that year, by taking the sinecure of Steward of the Chiltern Hundreds.

He then became a diplomat, serving in Switzerland, Tuscany, and Hanover.

References 
 

1800 births
1882 deaths
Younger sons of earls
People educated at Harrow School
Alumni of Balliol College, Oxford
Members of the Parliament of the United Kingdom for Plympton Erle
UK MPs 1826–1830